Total Response (subtitled The United States of Mind Phase 2) is an album by jazz pianist Horace Silver released on the Blue Note label in 1972 featuring performances by Silver with Cecil Bridgewater, Harold Vick, Richie Resnicoff, Bob Cranshaw and Mickey Roker, with vocals by Salome Bey and Andy Bey. In 2004, it was included as the second of a trilogy of albums compiled on CD as The United States of Mind.

Reception 
The Allmusic review by Stephen Thomas Erlewine awarded the album 2 stars, and called the album a  "sprawling, incoherent, and just plain weird mess of funk, fusion, soul-jazz, African spirituality, and hippie mysticism".

Track listing
All compositions by Horace Silver
 "Acid, Pot or Pills" - 4:26
 "What Kind of Animal Am I" - 3:38
 "Won't You Open up Your Senses" - 3:56
 "I've Had a Little Talk" - 3:46
 "Soul Searching" - 4:15
 "Big Business" - 5:22
 "I'm Aware of the Animals Within Me" - 3:45
 "Old Mother Nature Calls" - 6:17
 "Total Response" - 5:22

Personnel
Horace Silver - electric piano
Cecil Bridgewater - trumpet, flugelhorn
Harold Vick - tenor saxophone
Richie Resnicoff - guitar
Bob Cranshaw - electric bass
Mickey Roker - drums
Salome Bey (1, 2, 5-7, 9), Andy Bey (3, 4, 8) - vocals

References

Horace Silver albums
1972 albums
Blue Note Records albums
Albums produced by Francis Wolff
Albums produced by George Butler (record producer)
Albums recorded at Van Gelder Studio